Taunton railway station is a junction station on the route from London to Penzance,  west of London Paddington station. It is situated in Taunton, Somerset, and is operated by Great Western Railway. The station is also served by CrossCountry trains and by the West Somerset Railway on special event days and by mainline steam excursions.

History 

Originally opened on 1 July 1842 as part of the Bristol and Exeter Railway, Taunton was the terminus of the line until a new temporary terminus was opened on 1 May 1843 further west at Beambridge.

Isambard Kingdom Brunel's original design was for a single-sided station with two platforms, each with their own buildings and train sheds, placed on the south side of the line.  A hotel was built between them and the Grand Western Canal. Having both platforms on the town side of the line was meant to help passengers but was found to be problematic as the railway became busier, with each train having to cross the line used by trains in the opposite direction.  An engine shed was provided at the west end of the station.

A series of branches opened in the area during the next thirty years.  These were the Yeovil branch line (1 October 1853), the West Somerset Railway to Watchet (31 March 1862), the Chard Branch Line (11 September 1866), and the Devon and Somerset Railway (8 June 1871, extended to Barnstaple 1 November 1873). While none of these branches had a junction in Taunton, the trains were generally run through to Taunton to provide connections.

The station was unable to cope with all these extra trains and passengers, so a major rebuilding was completed on 17 August 1868. The "up station" at the east end was demolished and replaced by a more conventional platform on the north side of the line; the "down station" was extended onto the site now vacated, and a new single  train shed was provided covering the whole station. Goods traffic was moved away from the passenger platforms by the opening on 1 November 1896 of a pair of avoiding lines that skirted around the south side of the station behind the old hotel. A larger engine shed was opened in the same year.

The platforms were extended again in 1895. Now covering the whole length of the original single-sided station, they were the longest platforms on the Great Western Railway (which had amalgamated with the Bristol and Exeter company on 1 January 1876). New bay platforms were added to handle the trains from the branch lines.

In the 1930s the lines through Taunton from Cogload Junction to Norton Fitzwarren were widened from two to four tracks; those east of Taunton were brought into use on 13 December 1931 and those to the west on 14 February 1932. This work forced another rebuilding of the station. The train shed was dismantled and new buildings constructed on the up (north) side along with a new island platform in the middle of the station. This gave a platform face for each of the four through lines, which were brought into use on 7 February 1932. Work included a new subway that replaced the old footbridge, and a new booking office at road level on the north side of the station. The old goods shed was replaced by a two-storey goods warehouse next to the avoiding line, east of the station on 20 February 1932.

The platforms were numbered:
 The down relief platform, principally used by expresses from Bristol
 A bay at the east end, used for arrivals from Chard, Yeovil, Castle Cary
 The inner bay at the west end, double sided around the single track, principally used for Barnstaple departures
 The outer bay at the west end, principally used for Minehead departures
 The down main platform, mainly used by expresses from London
 The up main platform, mainly used by expresses to London
 The up relief platform, mainly used by expresses to Bristol
 A bay at the west end, occasionally used for Minehead/Barnstaple arrivals
 A bay at the east end, used for stopping train departures to Bristol and Yeovil
 
Although some no longer have tracks, all the platform structures remain.

Until 1970 the four tracks to the east of Taunton were not used as normal main and relief lines, but with the inner main lines for trains to London and the outer lines for trains to Bristol, to align with the way the tracks diverged at Cogload Junction, some miles to the east of the station. In 1970 under the Western Region of British Rail the central island platform was closed off and all trains stopping at Taunton used the outer platforms, except in an emergency when the central platform was pressed into use. London trains stopping at Taunton (which was most of them) now crossed over to the main lines at the London end of the station. The second pair of lines from Cogload were removed in 1986.

The goods depot closed for general traffic in 1965, although bulk coal was handled until 1972.  The engine shed closed on 1 January 1972, by which time it only served as a fueling point for local diesel shunting locomotives. The various branch lines closed during the 1960s and 1970s, so only one bay platform was retained for local trains starting towards Bristol Temple Meads. The island platform was taken out of regular use for a few years, although it could be opened up in an emergency (albeit with no platform numbers, nor a lift). This situation no longer applies as the platforms were reopened for normal services in 2000 and a new lift installed in 2007 to replace an electric "stair lift" which could carry one seated person at a time but no luggage. A west-facing bay platform has also been reinstated for passenger use, although there are no regular trains timetabled to use it.

Today the original "down station" building survives, along with the hotel and the extensions added in 1868.  An examination of the brickwork on the south-side building reveals where the footbridge was removed in favour of the present subway.  On the north side, the ticket office dates from 1983 but the remaining buildings generally date from the 1932 rebuilding and stand on foundations from 1868. The goods warehouse is largely derelict and most of the engine shed has been razed to the ground except for an asbestos-clad repair shop built in 1932 and the ramp that used to serve an elevated coaling stage.  The engine sidings are still used by engineers' plant machines; Freightliner locomotives are generally stabled at Fairwater Yard but occasionally use the old engine shed sidings for additional storage space.  The avoiding line is truncated but serves as a headshunt for the long engineers trains using Fairwater Yard.

The footbridge to the west of the station, known in the town as "Fortysteps", although Network Rail prefer to label it "40 Steps", a favoured location for generations of rail enthusiasts, was demolished at the end of 2013, due to construction of a new road alongside the railway. This was however replaced by a more modern bridge with both steps and slopes making it more accessible.

2021 saw the ticket office moved back to the south side of the station as part of works to improve passenger facilities and make easier links to the town centre. A 400-space multi-storey car park was also built.

Station Masters

Henry Clark
Alexander Gibson 1850 - 1886 
Arthur Nicholson Lailey 1886 - 1913
James Page 1913 - 1920 (afterwards station master at )
A.P. Watkins 1920 - 1926 (afterwards station master at )
O.J. Fenner 1926 - 1928 (afterwards station master at Reading)
J.R.C. Williams 1928 - 1931 (afterwards station master at Paddington)
George Thomas Fox 1931 - 1932 (formerly station master at Wrexham)
Arthur Stanley Sansom 1932 - 1944
C.E. Morris 1945 - 1950
James A. Denholm ???? - 1954
A.V. Wilcox ???? - 1958 
E.C. Frampton 1958 - ????

Description

The station is situated on an embankment and a bridge above road level. There is a car park on both sides of the station and bus services to the town centre call at a bus stop in front of the ticket office; those from the town call at a stop on the main road that passes beneath the station. The south block is a Grade II listed building.

Platform 5 is situated above the ticket office and is the main platform used by trains towards London Paddington, Bristol Temple Meads and the north. The station buffet is situated here. The east-facing bay platform 6 is beyond this; it only sees occasional use nowadays, mainly being used for local trains towards the Bristol station.

In the centre of the station is an island platform. The face on the north side is platform 4, which can be used by similar trains to platform 5. The face on the south side is platform 3, which is also used for services towards Exeter St Davids but is mainly used for terminating services from the Bristol direction that can also start back from here.

Platform 2 is used for services to Exeter and beyond. Trains can also start from this platform towards London and Bristol, if required.  At the north end is the bus shelter for rail-link buses to Minehead. It has level access from a second car park.

Platform 1 is another bay, at the west end of platform 2. This is not signalled for use by passenger trains but is sometimes used for stabling. Behind this are some sidings used by the engineers' department for stabling on-track plant and the headshunt for Fairwater Yard. This area also housed the station's engine shed but this closed many years ago, although the last remains were only demolished in 2012.

Terminating trains from Bristol that need to cross to platform 2 or 3 have to run forward towards Fairwater and then return to the station once the driver has changed ends. To reach platform 6, they have to make this move and then run right through the station, the driver change ends and then reverses into platform 6. First Great Western have proposed that alterations be made to the layout at the east end of the station to allow terminating trains from Bristol to run straight into platform 6. The shunting of trains across the layout at the west end of the station has long been a Taunton feature. In the days of trains to Minehead, Barnstaple and local stations to Exeter St Davids, terminating trains were drawn back from the up-side platforms, via various sidings, and then returned to the down-side departure platforms; pilot locomotives were provided to assist in the days of hauled stock.

Services 

CrossCountry operates services during the daytime from the North,  and Bristol Temple Meads through Taunton to Plymouth or Exeter.

Fairwater Yard 

A marshalling yard was opened to the west of the station on 30 July 1946. It was used for many years by the British Railways' Civil Engineer and was home to a Ruston & Hornsby 0-6-0 diesel shunter, PWM652. After the end of this permanent way work the sidings were little used, mainly being a place to store unwanted or damaged wagons.

During 2006 they were relaid and in January 2007 were returned to use. Fairwater is now the home for a High Output Track Renewal System. This is engaged on renewal of track on the Great Western Main Line west of Swindon, the Reading to Exeter Main Line and the Bristol to Taunton Line. The equipment based in the yard at that time was a Plasser & Theurer High Output Ballast Cleaner, a Matisa High Output Track Renewal Train, and smaller on-track plant. The Matisa Track Renewal Train was removed from Fairwater Yard in April 2012 after it had completed its need for use in the South West.

Taunton Concrete Works 
Taunton Concrete Works, situated to the north of the line east of the station, cast items for the railway such as bridge beams, platform components, cable troughs and fence posts. The facility was closed in 1994.

References 

Buildings and structures in Taunton
Railway stations in Somerset
Former Great Western Railway stations
Railway stations in Great Britain opened in 1842
Railway stations served by Great Western Railway
Railway stations served by CrossCountry
Grade II listed railway stations
Grade II listed buildings in Taunton Deane
DfT Category C1 stations